Vanessa Lam (born June 19, 1995) is an American former figure skater. She won two gold medals on the ISU Junior Grand Prix series and competed at the 2012 World Junior Championships.

Personal life 
Vanessa Lam was born in Pasadena, California. She is of Chinese and Cambodian descent. She has an elder sister, Nina.

Vanessa went on to pursue a degree in Integrative Biology at Harvard University. She graduated in 2018. She is currently focusing on giving back to the community through education, now working as an AmeriCorps Member at City Year.

Career 
Lam started skating at age 5 with her older sister. She debuted on the ISU Junior Grand Prix series in the 2010–11 season, winning gold in the Czech Republic.

In the 2011–12 JGP season, Lam won bronze in Australia and gold in Austria. She qualified for the Final in Quebec, where she placed fifth. She finished 13th at the 2012 World Junior Championships.

Lam placed fourth at her lone 2012–13 ISU Junior Grand Prix assignment. She withdrew from the 2013 U.S. Nationals due to knee and hip injuries sustained during training.

Programs

Competitive highlights 
GP = Grand Prix; JGP = Junior Grand Prix

References

External links 

 
 Vanessa Lam at IceNetwork

1995 births
American female single skaters
American sportspeople of Chinese descent
People from Bellflower, California
Living people
American people of Cambodian descent
Harvard University alumni
21st-century American women